Cerithideopsis californica, common name the California hornsnail or the California horn snail, is a species of sea snail, a marine gastropod mollusk in the family Potamididae. This series was previously known as Cerithidea californica.

Distribution
The distribution of Cerithideopsis californica is from central California, USA to Baja California Sur, Mexico.

The type locality is "California, in brackish water".

Description

The shell is turriform in shape and about 1 inch (25 mm) in length.

Ecology 
Cerithideopsis californica lives in salt-marsh dominated estuaries.

The snails primarily feed on benthic diatoms.

Throughout its range in California, these snails grow and reproduce from spring through fall (March–October) and cease growth and reproduction during the winter (November–February). Maximum longevity for these snails is at least 6–10 years, and this appears to be the case for uninfected as well as infected snails.

At least 18 trematode species parasitically castrate California horn snails. A trematode infects a snail with a miracidium larva that either swims to infect the snail, or hatches after the snail ingests the trematode egg. After infection, the trematode parthenitae clonally replicate and produce free-swimming offspring (cercariae). These offspring infect second intermediate hosts (various invertebrates and fishes) where they form cysts (metacercariae). The trematodes infect bird final hosts when birds eat second intermediate hosts.

References
This article incorporates CC-BY-2.0 text from the reference

Further reading 
 Driscoll A. L. (1972). "Structure and function of the alimentary tract of Batillaria zonalis and Cerithidea californica: style-bearing mesogastropods". Veliger 14: 375-386.
 Lafferty K. D. (1993). "Effects of parasitic castration on growth, reproduction and population dynamics of the marine snail Cerithidea californica". Marine Ecology Progress Series 96: 229-237. .
 Lafferty K. D. (1993). "The marine snail, Cerithidea californica, matures at smaller sizes where parasitism is high". Oikos 68(1): 3-11. JSTOR.
 Martin W. E. (1972). "An annotated key to the cercariae that develop in the snail Cerithidea californica". Bulletin of the Southern California Academy of Sciences 71: 39-43.
 McCloy M. J. (1979). "Population regulation in the deposit feeding mesogastropod Cerithidea californica as it occurs in a San Diego salt marsh habitat". MS. University of California, San Diego.
 Race M. S. (1981). "Field ecology and natural history of Cerithidea californica (Gastropoda: Prosobranchia) in San Francisco Bay". Veliger 24: 18-27.
 Sousa W. P. (1983). "Host life history and the effect of parasitic castration on growth a field study of Cerithidea californica (Gastropoda: Prosobranchia) and its trematode parasites". Journal of Experimental Marine Biology and Ecology 73(3): 273-296. .
 Sousa W. P. (1993). "Size-dependent predation on the salt-marsh snail Cerithidea californica Haldeman". Journal of Experimental Marine Biology & Ecology 166: 19-37.
 Sousa W. P & Gleason M. (1989). "Does parasitic infection compromise host survival under extreme environmental conditions: the case for Cerithidea californica (Gastropoda: Prosobranchia)". Oecologia, Berlin 80: 456-464. .

External links

Potamididae
Molluscs of the Pacific Ocean
Marine molluscs of North America
Gastropods described in 1840
Taxa named by Samuel Stehman Haldeman